CEB VER is a quality standard for voluntary carbon offset industry created by Commodity Exchange Bratislava. Based on the Kyoto Protocol's Clean Development Mechanism, CEB VER establishes criteria for validating, measuring, and monitoring carbon offset projects with option to trade carbon credits and use them for surrendering for individuals, organizations or companies that want to be carbon neutral.

Methodologies
Methodology express exact calculation on how many carbon credits can be issued for project developers. These carbon credits can be traded at Carbon Place.
First methodology issued under CEB VER standard was CEB VER Solar.

References

External links
 CEB Website
 VER Registry 
 The VER+ Standard profile on database of Market Governance Mechanisms 

Certification marks
Carbon finance